The Peșteana is a right tributary of the river Motru in Romania. It flows into the Motru near Broșteni.

References

Rivers of Romania
Rivers of Mehedinți County